Elizabeth Bernardita Fonseca Corrales (Heredia, 20 August 1949) was a deputy in the Costa Rican Legislative Assembly from 2006 to 2010, representing San José. Fonseca holds a doctorate in History and American Society from the University of Paris. She was president of the Citizens' Action Party (PAC for its Spanish initials) in 2010.

Political career
Fonseca is a founding member of PAC. She was elected as a deputy for San José in Costa Rican general elections in 2006. She helped organize PAC's opposition to the Central American Free Trade Agreement in 2006 and 2007.

Following the resignation of Alberto Cañas Escalante, Fonseca and medical doctor Rodrigo Cabezas both applied for the PAC presidency Fonseca was elected, promising to raise PAC's institutional profile. In 2013, Fonseca used her position to push for open primaries, which resulted in the election of Luis Guillermo Solís as PAC's presidential candidate. Solís would go on to win 78% of the national vote in the general election.

Fonseca credits PAC with breaking the nation's two-party rule by making the Social Christian Unity Party (PUSC for its Spanish initials) a minority party in the National Assembly.  While the National Liberation Party (PLN for its Spanish initials) maintains its majority, PUSC has lost many legislative seats to PAC.

Fonseca was appointed Minister of Culture in 2014.

Awards

Following the publication of her doctoral thesis in 1983, Fonseca gained significant academic recognition. The topic of her thesis, agrarian and colonial history in Costa Rica, helped document the country's early history.

 “Aquileo J. Echeverría” National Prize for History, 1984
 “Cleto González Víquez” Prize for Geography and History, 1984
 Professor in Residence, Academy of Geography and History, Costa Rica
 Academic Correspondent to Argentine, Venezuelan, Guatemalan, and Portuguese Academies of Geography and History

Publications and research

Fonseca has written or collaborated on the following projects and books:

 "Juan Manuel de Cañas"
 "Costa Rica colonial. La tierra y el hombre" ("Colonial Costa Rica: The Land and The People")
 "Historia de un pueblo indígena: Tucurrique" ("History of an Indigenous Tribe: Tucurrique")
 "Historia. Teoría y métodos" ("History: Theory and Methods")
 "Centroamérica. Su historia" ("Central America: Its History")
 "Historia General de Centroamérica. Tomo II" ("General History of Central America: Volume II")
 "Costa Rica en el Siglo XVIII" ("Costa Rica in the 18th Century")

References

1949 births
Living people
People from Heredia Province
Members of the Legislative Assembly of Costa Rica
Citizens' Action Party (Costa Rica) politicians
21st-century Costa Rican women politicians
21st-century Costa Rican politicians